Founded in 1675, Buxton College was a boys' Public School and, from 1923, a grammar school in Buxton, Derbyshire whose site has been expanded since 1990 to be used as the fully co-educational comprehensive Buxton Community School.
Dorothy Dewis, born in 1898, was the first Headmistress of Silverlands Girls Secondary School which was purpose built and was opened by the Duke of Devonshire who remained a supporter of the School for many years.  Miss Dewis had previously been Head of Barrs Hill School.  Miss Dewis was passionate about girls education and ensured all girls received a high standard of education.  She also ran a very successful Folk and Country Dancing club which performed widely and won many prizes.  She retired after 20 years service in 1960.  She never married and was totally dedicated to her, proving to be very popular with both girls and teachers.  Silverlands school building was demolished to make way for a housing estate.

History
The school was founded in 1675 by an amalgamation of various legacies of an earlier date together with subscriptions taken then. Its motto was Sic Luceat Lux Vestra - "Let your light shine forth."

The original school building was probably in Buxton next to St Anne’s Anglican Church on Bath Road. The school was placed in chancery between 1791 and 1816 and reopened in the, disused, St Anne’s Church. In 1840 it was moved to premises in the Market Place and in 1867 a School House at the corner of Market Street and South Street was built either in place of, or in addition to, the Market Place school. In 1873 it was determined by the charity Commissioners that the school should be classified as a grammar school. After its foundation the school appears to have been under the control of a number of different trusts, the latest one known was a scheme approved by the Queen in Council at Balmoral on 23 October 1876, giving the trustees authority to acquire land for new school buildings 'for not less than 80 scholars' and after re-organisation it then moved as the Buxton Endowed School to new premises opened on 27 September 1881 built on land off Green Lane (near the entrance to Poole's Cavern).

The new building in 1880–81 was by William Pollard of Manchester in the Gothic style. It had a small boarding house, by 1890 under the Headmaster Dr R. Archibald Little 1888–1910 the number of boarders had increased to 33. Many alterations and additions were made to the buildings during 1891–92. A chemistry laboratory which remained in use through to the 1970s, a workshop and a gymnasium. The original laundry was converted into a dining room and both it and the dormitories on the two floors above it were extended to double their length. In 1898, the school added a sanatorium at the rear of the headmasters house. The Assembly Hall was built during 1899–1900 and at the same time the old Schoolroom was divided into three much needed classrooms and a corridor giving access to them and the hall was constructed. By 1900 there were nearly 100 boys of whom 60 were boarders. By 1910 there were still over 70 boys but the number of boarders had dropped to 26 and the position of the school was precarious.

At the end of the Summer Term 1923 after two and a half centuries as an independent school, the College entered the State system as a maintained grammar school. As a County Grammar school alterations and improvements to the buildings were carried out throughout the year, under the direction of the Derbyshire County Architect's department, including a new heating system for the whole building, improved windows for the classrooms and renovation of the top dormitory baths and washbowls. Additional laboratory equipment was acquired for Physics and the laundry was equipped as a handicraft room - later to become the boarders locker & changing room.

Buxton College July 1927 aerial photograph. ©English Heritage http://www.britainfromabove.org.uk

In September 1927 two boys became the first Sixth Form at the school and building work began in the summer of 1928 on three sides of a new quadrangle designed by Derbyshire County Council Architect George H. Widdows to enable some of the expansion requested by the Headmaster A.D.C. Mason (1923–1944). The fourth side was never completed as designed, although thirty years later a new physics laboratory was built at one end of it. During the 1930s "Mr Mason accepted about 30 ... refugee German boys of Jewish extraction ... as boarders. Many of the German boys had high ability ... including Heinz Thannhauser undoubtedly one of the most brilliant boys ever to attend the School.  For this act of humanity and generosity (in some cases he [Mason] charged no fees and bore the whole cost himself) he met with a fair amount of local criticism."

In May 1953 the Local Education Authority purchased the nearby Arts & Crafts inspired house, formerly known as 'Heatherton' designed by W.R. Bryden and built in 1910 on the opposite side of Temple Road for the stockbroker Henry Lancashire.  The house renamed 'Hartington' was used by the school from September 1953 and the increased capacity enabled all classes to, at last, have their own base classrooms and the provision of an enlarged school library.

The Boarding House remained full until the late 1960s when de-colonisation and the contraction of H.M. Forces overseas led to a reduction in the demand for boarding places and by 1968–69 numbers fell to 40. Pupils at Buxton College had been divided - for the purpose of sporting competition - into 'Houses' and associated colours: 'Compton' (Red), 'Spencer' (Yellow) & 'Burlington' (Brown) first recorded in 1921 (and later 'Hartington'
)(Green). From September 1931 the 34 boarders (out of a total 192) were formed into a separate house 'Devonshire' (Blue) and in that year won the Cock House Trophy.

Former pupils of the school - Old Boys denoted themselves as Old Buxtonians.

Current use
Buxton College finally merged to become first, a Buxton comprehensive school for boys, giving it two campuses, at Kent's Bank (former site of Kent's Bank Secondary Modern Boys School), and College Road (former site of Buxton College).  It then successfully merged with the local girls' schools in 1990 to become properly coeducational; these were the former Cavendish Grammar School on Corbar Road and Silverland Secondary Modern School for Girls on Peveril Road - these two school sites are now housing estates. The first Head mistress of Silverlands secondary School for Girls was Miss Dorothy Dewis who remained at the school for over twenty years.  It formed Buxton Community School at the College Road campus.  The School, now as Buxton Community School officially opened in 19 October 1993, is fully coeducational and the historic problem of split sites for the schools of Buxton overcome. The Kent's Bank site became the site for Buxton Library.

See also
 It is not to be confused with High Peak College, a further education college.

Old Buxtonians - Principals
 Dr R. Archibald Little 1888–1910
 H.J.Lawson MA (Cantab)
 A.D.C. Mason (1923–1944)
 R. Bolton King (1944–1970)
 V.T. Middlemas (1970–

Old Buxtonians - Staff

1968
 E. Leyland (Deputy Headmaster) - Physics
 W.J. Branch - Physics
 K.W. Bland - Maths
 L. Banks - French
 P.W. Bray - Chemistry
 J.B. Cartwright - Sport
 W.V. Cheverst - French
 J.S. Collis - Sport
 W.E. Evans - Latin
 G. Frost - French & Latin
 M.R.L Loader - RE
 B. Gollop - French
 C. Haslam - Chemistry
 E.R. Jones - Art
 J.C. Lidgate - Maths
 R.A. Lowe - Biology
 J.J. McCarthy - 
 A.P. Percival - Music & History
 M.J. Rowe - Biology
 D.A. Sadler - English & Physics
 S.B. Smith - Maths
 J.R. Tate - French
 S.A. Tate - Geography
 N. Tatham - Chemistry
 S. Wilkinson - Scripture
 J.W. Wood - English
 R.Walsh - Music
 A.H.Williams - English, Housemaster Devonshire
 ?. Haresnape - History
 G. Morris - Technical Drawing

Old Buxtonians - Pupils
 John Leonard Clive (1924–1990), historian
 Mark Cocker, author and naturalist
Herbert Eisner, physicist and author
 Dale Hibbert, musician. Original bass player with The Smiths, author of "Boy Interrupted, memoir of a former Smith" Boy Interrupted
 Hugh Hickling, author
 Dr Christopher Jackson: Director Security International and Disabled Charity Philanthropist.
 Clinton 'Jeffers' Ball, double glazing entrepreneur and best at splashing in the school puddles
 David John Hodgkins, Director, Resources and Planning, Health and Safety Executive,
 Walton Newbold (1888–1943), the first British member of parliament elected as a Communist
 Edmund Ashworth Radford, MP
 Robert Waller, election expert
 Thomas Wright (1859-1936), Author 
The Ven John Youens (1914–1993), Chaplain General
 Hugh Sykes (1961 - ), Author, Advertising A to Z Featuring The Blue Willow Pattern 1 & 2  Books held by the Smithsonian and Universities
 Alan Rapley-1985 Captain of the Great Britain Swimming Team - Atlanta Olympic Games 1996. Member of British Record Breaking 4 X 100m Freestyle Relay Team.

References

Defunct schools in Derbyshire
Educational institutions established in the 1670s
1675 establishments in England
Buxton